Botswana participated at the 2017 Summer Universiade, in Taipei, Taiwan with 20 competitors in 4 sports.

Competitors
The following table lists Botswana's delegation per sport and gender.

Athletics

Men

Track Events

Women

Track Events

Field Events

Badminton

Singles and Doubles

Team

Table Tennis

Tennis

References

Nations at the 2017 Summer Universiade
2017 in Botswana sport